The Frick Collection is an art museum in New York City. Its permanent collection (normally at the Henry Clay Frick House, currently at the Frick Madison) features Old Master paintings and European fine and decorative arts, including works by Bellini, Fragonard, Goya, Holbein, Rembrandt, Titian, Turner, Velázquez, Vermeer, Thomas Gainsborough, and many others. The museum was founded by the industrialist Henry Clay Frick (1849–1919), and its collection has more than doubled in size since opening to the public in 1935. The Frick also houses the Frick Art Reference Library, a premier art history research center established in 1920 by Helen Clay Frick (1888–1984).

History 

The Frick Collection became a public institution when Henry Clay Frick bequeathed his art collection, as well as his Upper East Side residence at 1 East 70th Street, to the public for the enjoyment of future generations. 

Frick started his substantial collection as soon as he began amassing his fortune. A considerable portion of his art collection is located in his former residence “Clayton” in Pittsburgh, which is today a part of the Frick Art & Historical Center. Another part was given by his daughter and heiress Helen to the Frick Fine Arts Building, which is on the campus of the University of Pittsburgh.

The family did not permanently move from Pittsburgh to New York until 1905. Henry Frick initially leased the William H. Vanderbilt House at 640 Fifth Avenue, to which he moved a substantial portion of his collection. He had his permanent residence built between 1912 and 1914 by Thomas Hastings of Carrère and Hastings. He stayed in the house until his death in 1919. He willed the house and all of its contents, including the works of art, furniture, and decorative objects, as a public museum. His widow Adelaide Howard Childs Frick, however, retained the right of residence and continued living in the mansion with her daughter Helen. After Adelaide Frick died in 1931, the conversion of the house into a public museum started.

John Russell Pope altered and enlarged the building in the early 1930s to adapt it to use as a public institution. It opened to the public on December 16, 1935. Various additions to the architecture and landscape architecture of the museum site have been considered over the years including the placement of a prominent magnolia garden from the 1930s. As stated by the museum announcements: "As a result of a decision of the Board of Trustees in 1939, three magnolias were selected for the Fifth Avenue garden. The two trees on the lower tier are Saucer Magnolias (Magnolia soulangeana) and the species on the upper tier by the flagpole is a Star Magnolia (Magnolia stellata)."

Expansion and controversy
Additional expansions of the museum took place in 1977 and in 2011. In 2014, the museum announced further expansion plans, but came up against community opposition because it would result in the loss of a garden designed by noted British landscape architect Russell Page. Landscape preservation advocate Charles A. Birnbaum of The Cultural Landscape Foundation garnered widespread attention when he and others disproved statements that the garden had been intended as only a temporary installation. The garden was saved when Birnbaum produced a contradictory original document issued by the Frick clearly identifying the space as a permanent garden. The Frick ultimately dropped those plans and is said to be considering other options.

In March 2021, the Collection temporarily relocated to Frick Madison, at the Marcel Breuer-designed building at 945 Madison Avenue, during the renovation of the Henry Clay Frick House.

Collection 
The Frick is one of the preeminent small art museums in the United States, with a high-quality collection of old master paintings and fine furniture housed in nineteen galleries of varying size within the former residence. Frick had intended the mansion to become a museum eventually, and a few of the paintings are still arranged according to Frick's design. Besides its permanent collection, the Frick has always organized small, focused temporary exhibitions.

The collection features some of the best-known paintings by major European artists as well as numerous works of sculpture and porcelain. It also has 18th-century French furniture, Limoges enamel, and Oriental rugs. After Frick's death, his daughter, Helen Clay Frick, and the Board of Trustees expanded the collection: nearly half of the collection's artworks have been acquired since 1919. Although the museum cannot lend the works of art that belonged to Frick, as stipulated in his will, The Frick Collection does lend artworks and objects acquired since his death.

Included in the collection are Jean-Honoré Fragonard's masterpiece The Progress of Love, three paintings by Johannes Vermeer including Mistress and Maid, two paintings by Jacob van Ruisdael including Quay at Amsterdam, and Piero della Francesca's St. John the Evangelist.

Temporary exhibits
When the Mauritshuis in The Hague was under reconstruction in 2013 some of its works, including Vermeer's Girl with a Pearl Earring and Carel Fabritius's The Goldfinch, toured the United States and, in New York, were exhibited at the Frick.

Frick Art Reference Library 

The Frick Collection oversees the nearby Frick Art Reference Library. The collections held at the library focus on art of the Western tradition from the fourth century to the mid-twentieth century, and chiefly include information about paintings, drawings, sculpture, prints, and illuminated manuscripts. Archival materials augment its research collections. Prior to opening in 1924, Helen Clay Frick used the basement bowling alley as storage space for the library. The library quickly became known as a prime resource for students.

Management

Attendance 
According to The Art Newspaper, the Frick Collection has a typical annual attendance of 275,000 to 300,000.

Governance 
In 2011, Ian Wardropper succeeded Anne Poulet, who had run the Frick Collection as director since 2003. Poulet took the position after Samuel Sachs II stepped down after running the institution for six years. Poulet was the first female director of the Frick. During her time at the Frick Collection, Poulet increased the museum’s small board of trustees, adding 10 new members. She also introduced the Director’s Circle, a group of 44 members who each give a minimum of $25,000 a year to the Frick Collection, although many have made significantly larger contributions.

Funding 
By 1997, the Frick Collection had an operating budget of $10 million and an endowment of $170 million. Despite its large endowment, the institution still needs money to preserve the building.

Education 
In 2008, the Frick hired Rika Burnham as head of their education department. Burnham introduced several changes to the museum, including the introduction of monthly free entrance to the museum, called First Fridays. First Fridays include gallery talks and activities for visitors.

Artworks 

Featured artists include:

 Giovanni Bellini (St. Francis in Ecstasy)
 François Boucher
 Cimabue
 John Constable
 Jean-Baptiste-Camille Corot
 Aelbert Cuyp
 Jacques-Louis David
 Gentile da Fabriano
 Jean-Honoré Fragonard
 El Greco
 Thomas Gainsborough
 Joshua Reynolds
 Francisco Goya
 Frans Hals
 Malvina Hoffman
 Hans Holbein the Younger
 Jean Auguste Dominique Ingres
 Rembrandt
 Pierre-Auguste Renoir
 Andrea Riccio

 Jacob van Ruisdael
 Barna da Siena
 Titian
 J. M. W. Turner
 Diego Velázquez
 Johannes Vermeer
 Anthony van Dyck
 Jan van Eyck
 James McNeill Whistler

Selected highlights

See also 
 Sèvres pot-pourri vase in the shape of a ship
 Cooper–Hewitt, National Design Museum

References 
Notes

Further reading

  (Press Release, October 11, 2006, Retrieved November 8, 2013)
 Bernice Davidson, Susan Galassi. Art in the Frick Collection : Paintings, Sculpture, Decorative Arts. Harry N Abrams. 1996. 
 Scala Publishers. Frick Collection: Handbook of Paintings. Scala Arts & Heritage. 2006. 
 Bernice Davidson, Edgar Munhall, Nadia Tscherny. Paintings from the Frick Collection . Harry N. Abrams. 1991. 
 Colin B. Bailey. Fragonard's Progress of Love at The Frick Collection. GILES. 2011. 
 Joseph Focarino. The Frick Collection, An Illustrated Catalogue. Volume IX: Drawings, Prints, and Later Acquisitions. Frick Collection. 2003. 
 Xavier Salomon, with Aimee Ng and Giulio Dalvit. Cocktails with a Curator: The Frick Collection. New York: Rizzoli Electa. 2022. . Review

External links 
 
Virtual tour of the Frick Collection provided by Google Arts & Culture
 The Frick Collection, Archives Directory for the History of Collecting in America

 
1935 establishments in New York City
Art museums established in 1935
Art museums and galleries in New York City
Fifth Avenue
Former private collections in the United States
Frick Art Reference Library
Museums in Manhattan
Upper East Side